Ivan kula ("Ivan tower"; Ivanova kula, Иванова кула, "Ivan's tower") is a fortress of Ivan Kosančić, located 33 km south of town Kuršumlija, Serbia, on the mountain Radan. The fort is located on a separate top 1076 m. near the village of Ivan Kula, southwest tip of Đak (1400 m).

Archaeological Site 

The city is built on top of the volcanic cone, which is flattened. Tower has a height of 14 m, the sides ca 7.78 and 5.80 m, standing on Roman foundations, with 1.34 m thick walls of rough-cut blocks hourglass. On the north side of the tower rests on a medieval church with my 56 degree, razed to the ground. On the south side are the remains of the young building.

Historical facts 

After the Battle of Kosovo, the city came under the rule of Despot Stefan Lazarevic 1412 years.

Tradition 

From this fort are Ivan Kosančić and Milan Toplica, host of the upper and lower Toplica region passed over Trpeze (plateau on the mountain Radan), went to the Battle of Kosovo in 1389. Along with his blood brothers, Milan Toplica and Miloš Obilić belonged to the Knights - the dragon.

Literature 

  Serbien — historisch-ethnographische Reisestudien (Serbia — Ethnographic and Historical Travel Studies)-Felix Philipp Kanitz. Leipzig (1868).
 Medieval cities in Serbia, Montenegro and southern Serbia - Aleksandar Deroko

References 

Forts in Serbia
Toplica District
Medieval Serbian architecture
Kuršumlija
Ruins in Serbia